Dovers Building is a heritage building in Melbourne, Australia. Built in 1908 by architect and engineer, Hugh Ralston Crawford,Crawford held the Australian patent rights for the Turner Mushroom flat slab system which was patented by C.A.P. Turner in the U.S.A. in 1905. This system was so called due to the peculiar formation of rods around the column head and the rapidity with which they could be erected. Between 1906 and 1909, at least eighteen other buildings of this type were built in the U.S.A.

Dovers Building was erected as a warehouse and factory for the firm Sniders and Abrahams, Manufacturing Tobacconists in 1908 and was the second example of Turner's flat plate system of reinforced concrete construction to be built and was begun in the same year as Turners Lindeke Warner Building in Minnesota. It was originally a five storey structure, with an extra two storeys were added in 1938 also designed by Crawford.

Built in the Edwardian period in the Chicagoesque style, the facades are decorated with foliated capitals and arches at the top floor level of the original building, but otherwise the walls are not decorated.

This was the 1st flat slab building in Australia using the system and Crawford subsequently designed a large number of other buildings using the Turner system. Dovers Building is listed on the Victorian Heritage Register.

References

Bibliography
 Exporting American Architecture, 1870-2000, by Jeffrey W. Cody
 Miles Lewis [ed], Two Hundred Years of Concrete in Australia (North Sydney 1988), pp 26–7.

Art Deco architecture in Melbourne
Heritage-listed buildings in Melbourne
Commercial buildings completed in 1936
1908 establishments in Australia
Buildings and structures in Melbourne City Centre